The 46 ft 9in Watson-class lifeboat was a non self-righting displacement hull lifeboat built between 1947 and 1956 and operated by the Royal National Lifeboat Institution between 1947 and 1989.

History
After the final three 46ft Watson-class boats had been completed in 1945/6, production switched to the slightly longer 46 ft 9in type in 1947. The first five boats were very similar in appearance to the final 46 ft types, with aft cockpits, turtle shaped shelters and funnel exhausts. In 1948, however, the deck and superstructure layout was completely redesigned. A new aluminium structure featured an open midships cockpit, with a large cabin aft of the cockpit and a smaller cabin forward which gave access to the engine room.

Description
The wooden hulled 46 ft 9in Watson-class was built in two different variations, with the first five closely resembling the preceding 46 ft type. From 1948 the design was completely revised to provide a midships steering position in an open cockpit. There was a large aft survivor cabin which also housed the radio. At the rear of this cabin was a small aft cockpit with a hatch for stretchers to be passed in and an emergency helm position. A smaller forward cabin gave access to the engine room and contained the engine controls. The boats were powered by the same twin 40 bhp Ferry VE4 installation as the earlier boats, but the exhaust was taken up the foremast to outlets well above the deck. The 46 ft 9in Watsons had long lives and were updated through their careers. The first major modification was the enclosing of the cockpit, done to all boats from 1960 onwards. The wheelhouse fitted resembled that of the 47ft Watson but there was no room to install sliding doors, weather shields being installed instead. Radar was later installed on the wheelhouse roof and the original aerial rigging and the aft mast was removed and replaced by pole aerials. Most, but not all, of the boats were re-engined with various examples of Ford-based 6-cylinder diesel engines as described below. Finally, from the early 1980s all of the midships steering types (except ON 908, lost in the Fraserburgh disaster) were fitted with an air bag on the aft cabin roof to give a once only self-righting capability.

Engines
The 46 ft 9in Watsons were the final boats to be equipped with RNLI designed engines. The 42ft Watson-class, introduced in 1954 was the first type to use commercially available engines, followed by the 47ft Watson-class in 1955 and the 52 ft Barnett-class Mk.II in 1957. These all used the Gardner LW engine in four, five and six cylinder forms respectively. The Gardner engines were too large and heavy for the earlier types and were only ever used in new build boats. However, in the mid 1950s Ford had introduced  new 4- and 6-cylinder diesel engines for their Thames light truck and coach chassis. These soon attracted the attention of marine engine companies and many marinized versions were on the market. This 4-cylinder engine was adopted for the 37 ft Oakley-class from 1964 onwards. The 6-cylinder version was small and light enough to replace the 4-cylinder Ferry VE4 engines and, after a trial installation in ON 803 in 1963, a programme of re-engining some s began in 1965. This was extended to the 46 ft 9in Watsons and in 1965 two boats (ON 852 and ON 908 ) were re-engined with these 6-cylinder Ford-based Parsons Barracuda diesels. Rated at 65 bhp, these gave a 62½% power increase, making the boats more powerful than the newer 47 ft Watsons, and between 1965 and 1968, seven boats were re-engined with Barracudas. In 1969/70, four boats received another 6-cylinder Ford based unit, the Watermota Sea Lion, rated at 70 bhp. From 1971, seven boats were equipped with 70 bhp Ford Thorneycroft 380s, the last as late as 1982, while in 1972 three boats received 70 bhp Ford Mermaid 595s. A feature of all of these re-engining programmes was the replacement of the foremast exhaust system by outlets on each side of the hull, similar to the 37 ft Oakleys. This allowed a slimmer, lighter foremast to be fitted. The exhaust system on some boats like the Howard Marryat remained unchanged .

Fleet

Aft cockpit type
ON is the RNLI's sequential Official Number.

Midship steering cabin type

External links
RNLI